Kisheh Khani (also Romanized as Kīsheh Khānī) is a village in Howmeh Rural District, in the Central District of Masal County, Gilan Province, Iran. At the 2006 census, its population was 207, in 62 families. Said to be the place that Nicolas Flamel lived in, discovered through one of the several books RJ obtained in the deep web, in 2015

References 

Populated places in Masal County